John Lewis (1912–1996) was a printer, illustrator and collector of printed ephemera.

Information
Lewis was educated at Charterhouse and Goldsmiths', where his contemporaries included Denton Welch and Carel Weight. From 1951 to 1963 he taught graphic design at the Royal College of Art. With Michael Twyman and Maurice Rickards, he was a pioneer in the study of printed ephemera, and in 1962 published the first major book in the field, Printed Ephemera: the changing uses of type and letterforms in English and American printing. In the 1960s Lewis also edited an influential series of paperbacks for Studio Vista in the UK and Reinhold in the US, including authors such as Peter Cook, Theo Crosby, Alan Fletcher, Ken Garland, Bob Gill, Norman Potter, David Pye, Paul Rand and Alison and Peter Smithson.

The John Lewis Printing Collection of more than 20,000 items from the fifteenth to the twentieth century is held at Reading University.

Selected works
 1947 A Handbook of Printing Types
 1954 Graphic Design: with special reference to lettering, typography and illustration
 1962 Printed Ephemera: the changing uses of type and letterforms in English and American printing
 1964 (with Bob Gill) Illustration: aspects and directions
 1965 Typography: basic principles
 1966 Handbook of Type and Illustration
 1967 The Twentieth Century Book: its illustration and design
 1976 Collecting Printed Ephemera: a background to social habits and social history, to eating and drinking, to travel and heritage
 1978 Typography: design and practice
 1994 Such Things Happen: the life of a typographer

References

External links
 
 
 

1912 births
1996 deaths
English typographers and type designers
English graphic designers
British designers
People educated at Charterhouse School
Alumni of Goldsmiths, University of London
Academics of the Royal College of Art